The North West Football League is an Australian rules football competition in North West Tasmania. The league was previously known as the "Northern Tasmanian Football League" from its inception in 1987 until the end of the 2014 season.

History
The Northern Tasmanian Football League (NTFL) was founded in 1987 to replace the Northern Tasmanian Football Association (NTFA) - no relation to the current NTFA - and the North Western Football Union (NWFU) which suffered as a result of the defection of clubs joining the new TFL Statewide League in 1986 – the NTFA had lost North Launceston and East Launceston to the TFL Statewide League at the start of 1986, then lost City-South midway through that season when it merged with East Launceston; the NWFU lost Devonport and Cooee to the Statewide League at the conclusion of the 1986 season.

After the collapse of the Statewide League at the end of 2000, the northern and coastal clubs from that competition returned to the NTFL and dominated the competition for the next eight years (Burnie and Launceston won the next eight premierships between them). With the revival of the Statewide League in 2009, the same five clubs left the NTFL again (North Launceston, South Launceston, Launceston, Burnie and Devonport), resulting in the contraction of the league to a six-club coastal composition.

In the early years, the NTFL was contested by a mixture of smaller northern and north-western clubs, but the northern clubs gradually departed, and since 2009 the league has been contested solely by clubs from the north-western coast, all with a NWFU history. Consequently, at the end of the 2014 season, the name of the league was changed to the North West Football League (NWFL).

In 2015, Burnie and Devonport rejoined the competition, each fielding its reserves team in the NWFL seniors while continuing to field its senior team in the Statewide League reserves; this increased the league numbers up to eight. In early 2017, Burnie withdrew from this arrangement, which dropped the number of teams down to seven. Then, in 2018, Burnie and Devonport withdrew their senior teams from the Statewide League and each entered the NWFL proper. The league's senior premiership is now contested by seven clubs.

Timeline

Clubs

Current clubs (2021)

Former NTFL/NWFL clubs

Notes

Grand Finals
2022 Devonport 7.17 (59) def Wynyard 7.10 (52) at Latrobe
2021 Devonport 6.8 (44) def Penguin 5.11 (41) at Latrobe
2020 Burnie 11.16 (82) def Devonport 6.7 (43) at Latrobe
2019 Burnie 9.17 (71) def Devonport 9.8 (62) at Latrobe
2018   Burnie                      10.14 (74)    def  Ulverstone              8.10 (58)    at Latrobe
2017   Ulverstone               11.10 (76)    def   Latrobe                   7.10 (52)    at Latrobe
2016   Latrobe                    10.12 (72)   def   Penguin                   9.15 (69)   at Latrobe
2015   Wynyard                 19.14 (138)   def   Ulverstone              11.10 (76)   at Latrobe
2014   Wynyard                24.16 (160)   def   Ulverstone               6.8 (44)   at Latrobe
2013   Latrobe                  22.16 (148)   def   Wynyard                14.17 (101)   at Latrobe
2012   Wynyard                   11.12 (78)   def   Latrobe                    8.17 (65)   at Latrobe
2011    Latrobe                  18.15 (123)   def   Penguin                  17.17 (119)   at Latrobe
2010   Latrobe                 20.13 (133)   def   Ulverstone             16.7 (103)   at Latrobe
2009  Ulverstone            22.14 (146)  def   Smithton                  8.10 (56)   at Latrobe
2008  Launceston            17.18 (120)  def   Burnie Dockers    14.23 (107)   at Latrobe
2007  Launceston             19.9 (123)  def   Ulverstone            16.12 (108)   at Latrobe
2006  Launceston           22.14 (146)  def   Devonport               13.11 (89)   at Latrobe
2005  Burnie Dockers       8.15  (63)  def   Devonport               6.10 (46)   at Latrobe
2004  Burnie Dockers     23.19 (157)  def   Devonport                7.8 (50)   at Latrobe
2003  Burnie Dockers      14.11  (95)   def   North Launceston  6.13 (49)   at Latrobe
2002  Burnie Dockers      14.5  (89)   def   Ulverstone              5.12 (47)   at Latrobe
2001   Burnie Dockers      17.14 (116)   def   North Launceston   7.10 (52)   at Latrobe
2000  Ulverstone              13.8 (86)   def   Latrobe                    7.10 (52)   at Latrobe
1999   South Launceston 11.19 (85)   def   Smithton                   7.8 (50)   at Latrobe
1998   South Launceston   9.11 (65)   def   East Devonport        9.4 (58)   at Latrobe
1997   Ulverstone             21.8 (134)   def   East Devonport        8.8 (56)   at Latrobe
1996   Ulverstone            18.13 (121)   def   Wynyard                    8.11 (59)   at Latrobe
1995   Ulverstone           18.15 (123)   def   Wynyard                   14.9 (93)   at Latrobe
1994   Ulverstone               11.8 (74)   def   Latrobe                      7.8 (50)   at Latrobe
1993   Ulverstone            14.12 (96)   def   Scottsdale                  8.7 (55)   at Latrobe
1992   Burnie Tigers       18.10 (118)   def   Penguin                    10.5 (65)   at West Park
1991    Smithton                18.9 (117)   def   Ulverstone               10.9 (69)   at West Park
1990   Ulverstone           18.13 (121)   def   Scottsdale                 12.7 (79)   at West Park
1989   Scottsdale            13.10 (88)   def   Smithton                  10.10 (70)   at West Park
1988  East Devonport    20.7 (127)   def   Burnie Tigers         18.15 (123)   at Devonport Oval
1987  Ulverstone             13.19 (97)   def   East Devonport       12.12 (84)   at West Park

Attendance
The Northern Tasmanian Football League is considered to be one of the strongest leagues in the state and has a strong supporter following.
Games in the NTFL average around 500 spectators.

References

External links
Official North Western Football League Website

Australian rules football competitions in Tasmania